Ralph Fitch (1550 – 1611) was a gentleman merchant of London and one of the earliest British travellers and merchants to visit Mesopotamia, the Persian Gulf, Indian Ocean, south Asia & Southeast Asia. At first he was no chronicler but he did eventually write descriptions of the south-east Asia he saw in 1583–1591, and upon his return to England, in 1591, became a valuable consultant for the English East India Company.

Career
Fitch's place of birth has long been a mystery but recent research indicates that he was most likely born in All Saints' parish, Derby. The first known documentary reference to him is in the archives of the Worshipful Company of Leathersellers, of which he was a Freeman and from which Company he received a loan of £50 for two years, 1575–77. In February 1583 he embarked in the Tyger for Tripoli (the seaport of Aleppo) in Syria, together with merchants John Newberry and John Eldred, a jeweller named William Leedes and a painter, James Story, all financed by the Levant Company. This was the latest in a series of English attempts to penetrate the trade of the Indian Ocean and Far East, going back to Anthony Jenkinson's travels in Central Asia in the 1550s. From Aleppo they reached the Euphrates, descended the river from Bir to Fallujah, crossed southern Mesopotamia to Baghdad, and dropped down the Tigris to Basra (May to July 1583).  Here Eldred stayed behind to trade, while Fitch and the others sailed down the Persian Gulf to the Portuguese fortress and trading station at Ormuz, where they were promptly arrested as spies (at Venetian instigation, they claimed, as the Venetians resented the 16th-century Portuguese commercial monopoly in the Indian Ocean that called an end to centuries of Venetian, Genoese and Pisan – plus Catalan – dealings with Arab middlemen, down from the Middle Ages) and sent as prisoners to the viceroy of Portuguese Goa and Damaon (September to October).

Through the sureties procured by two Jesuits (one being Thomas Stevens, formerly of New College, Oxford, the first Englishman known to have reached India by the Cape route in 1579), Fitch and his friends regained their liberty. Story chose to join the Jesuits, and the others managed to escape from Goa (April 1584). They travelled through the heart of India to the court of the Great Mogul Akbar, then probably at Agra.  The jeweller Leedes obtained a remunerative post with Akbar while Fitch continued his journey of exploration.  Fitch did the first leg of that journey, from Agra to Allahabad, by joining a convoy "of one hundred and fourscore boates laden with Salt, Opium, Hinge (asafoetida), Lead, Carpets and diverse other commodities" going "downe the river jumna (Yamuna)". He reached Allahabad sometime in November 1585, when work on Akbar's great Fort at Allahabad was nearing completion. In September 1585 Newberry decided to begin his return journey overland via Lahore. He disappeared, presumably being robbed and murdered, in the Punjab.

Fitch went on, descending the Jumna and the Ganges, to visit Allahabad, Benares, Patna, Kuch Behar, Hughli, Chittagong, etc. (1585–1586).
His appreciating words about the Indian muslin.

He then pushed on by sea to Pegu and Burma. Here he visited the Rangoon area, ascended the Irrawaddy some distance, acquired a remarkable acquaintance with inland Pegu, and even reached to the Tai of Shan states and the Tai kingdom of Lanna (December 1586 and January 1587).

Early in 1588 he visited Portuguese Malacca, another of Portugal's great fortresses and the gateway to the Far East, but found the security too strict to get passage into the China Sea. In the autumn of this year he began his homeward travels, first to Bengal; then round the Indian coast, touching at Portuguese Cochin and Goa, to Ormuz; next up the Persian Gulf to Basra and up the Tigris to Mosul (Nineveh); finally via Tirfa, Bir on the Euphrates.  He was appointed the Levant Company's Consul in Aleppo and Tripoli, to the Mediterranean.  He arrived back in London on 29 April 1591, eight years after he had left.  Since no news of him had reached his family and friends in that time, he had been presumed dead after seven years and his will had been proved.  He resumed his involvement with the Leathersellers' Company, becoming a Liveryman in 1599, serving as Warden in 1607 and joining the company's Court of Assistants in 1608.  His experience was greatly valued by the founders of the English East India Company, including another of Elizabeth's adventurers Sir James Lancaster who consulted him on Indian affairs.

Fitch ranks among the most remarkable of Elizabethan adventurers.  There is no evidence he ever married and the main beneficiaries of his final will in 1611 were eight nieces and two nephews.

Impact and legacy
 Fitch's journey is referred to indirectly by William Shakespeare in Act 1, Scene 3, Line 7 of Macbeth (circa 1606), where the First Witch cackles about a sailor's wife: "Her husband's to Aleppo gone, master of the Tyger."

Works
 Aanmerklyke Reys van Ralph Fitch, Koopman te Londen, Gedaan van Anno 1583 tot 1591, (1706), Leyden, Van der Aa 
 Ralph Fitch, England's Pioneer To India And Burma: His Companions And Contemporaries, (1899), John Horton Ryley,

See also
Chronology of European exploration of Asia
John Mildenhall

References

Bibliography

External links
 Full text of "Ralph Fitch : England's pioneer to India and Burma : his companions and contemporaries, with his remarkable narrative told in his own words" 
Account of the Voyage of Ralph Fitch, Merchant of London. This part of the account pertains to the year 1583.

1550 births
1611 deaths
English merchants
16th-century merchants
17th-century merchants
16th-century English writers
16th-century male writers
17th-century English writers
17th-century English male writers
16th-century explorers
17th-century explorers
English explorers
Explorers of Asia
Year of birth uncertain
British East India Company people